Hiram Slack (28 August 1808 – 1853) was an English cricketer with possibly amateur status who was active from 1831 to 1832. He was born in Hucknall Torkard, Nottinghamshire and died in Staffordshire. He made his first-class debut in 1831 and appeared in two matches as an unknown handedness batsman whose bowling style is unknown, playing for Nottingham Cricket Club. He scored 47 runs with a highest score of 23 and took no wickets.

References

1808 births
1853 deaths
English cricketers
English cricketers of 1826 to 1863
Nottingham Cricket Club cricketers